Medicinska Škola Tuzla, is a four-year high school that prepares and qualifies students for immediate work in health institutions, as well as for continuing education in colleges and higher education institutions. It was founded April 7, 1954. Classes are held in the Bosnian language. There is great interest in this school, considering the attractiveness of such professions and their employment opportunities, and also for the opportunity of continuing study at the medical faculty (college) at the University of Tuzla.

References

Schools in Bosnia and Herzegovina

Education in Tuzla
Buildings and structures in Tuzla